The Nunusaku languages are a group of Malayo-Polynesian languages, spoken on and around the island of Seram. None of the languages have more than about twenty thousand speakers, and several are endangered with extinction.

Classification
Kayeli
Patakai–Manusela 
Nuaulu
Huaulu, Manusela
Three Rivers
Wemale
Amalumute
Yalahatan
Northwest Seram:  Hulung, Saleman, Loun, Ulat Inai (Alune, Naka'ela), Lisabata-Nuniali
Piru Bay languages (20 languages)

References

Languages of Indonesia
Central Maluku languages
Seram Island